SM UB-131 was a German Type UB III submarine or U-boat in the German Imperial Navy during World War I. She was commissioned into the German Imperial Navy on 4 July 1918 as SM UB-131.

UB-131 was surrendered to the Allies at Harwich on 21 November 1918 in accordance with the requirements of the Armistice with Germany. She was wrecked near Bulverhythe on 9 Jan 21 while in-tow from Harwich to Falmouth to take part in explosive trials. The wreck was sold to F. Ray & Sons on 23 May 1921 for £655, and was broken up in situ.

Construction

She was built by AG Weser of Bremen and following just under a year of construction, launched at Bremen on 4 June  1918. UB-131 was commissioned later the same year under the command of Kptlt. Gerhard Schulz. Like all Type UB III submarines, UB-131 carried 10 torpedoes and was armed with a  deck gun. UB-131 had a displacement of  while surfaced and  when submerged. Her engines enabled her to travel at  when surfaced and  when submerged.

References

Notes

Citations

Bibliography 

 

German Type UB III submarines
World War I submarines of Germany
U-boats commissioned in 1918
1918 ships
Ships built in Bremen (state)